Aisha Nakiyemba (born 14 May 1993) is a Ugandan badminton player. She competed at the 2018 Commonwealth Games in Gold Coast. She was the women's doubles bronze medalist at the 2019 African Games partnered with Gladys Mbabazi.

Nakiyemba educated business administration at Ndejje University, and works at the Kampala club.

Achievements

African Games 
Women's doubles

BWF International Challenge/Series (4 runners-up) 
Women's singles

Women's doubles

  BWF International Challenge tournament
  BWF International Series tournament
  BWF Future Series tournament

References

External links 
 

1993 births
Living people
People from Mityana District
Ugandan female badminton players
Badminton players at the 2018 Commonwealth Games
Commonwealth Games competitors for Uganda
Competitors at the 2019 African Games
African Games bronze medalists for Uganda
African Games medalists in badminton